St Barnabas Hospital is a Provincial government funded hospital for the Nyandeni Local Municipality area in Libode, Eastern Cape in South Africa.

The hospital departments include Emergency department, Paediatric ward, Maternity ward, Out Patients Department, Surgical Services, Medical Services, Operating Theatre & CSSD Services, Pharmacy, Anti-Retroviral (ARV) treatment for HIV/AIDS, Post Trauma Counseling Services, X-ray Services, Physiotherapy, NHLS Laboratory, Laundry Services, Kitchen Services and Mortuary.

Hospitals in the Eastern Cape
OR Tambo District Municipality